Giuseppe "Pino" Locchi (10 November 1925 – 21 November 1994) was an Italian actor and voice actor.

After starting his screen career as a child actor in the 1930s, Locchi later became a very prominent voice actor dubbing foreign films for release in the Italian market.

Biography
Locchi began his acting career in 1932 starring in the film The Last Adventure and he continued his acting career as a child until 1942. As a voice actor, he dubbed the voices of many actors. He was the official Italian voice of Sean Connery until his death in 1994. Other actors he dubbed included Tony Curtis, Roger Moore, Charles Bronson, Terence Hill, Sidney Poitier, Jean-Paul Belmondo and many more.

Because Locchi was Sean Connery's official voice actor, he was the primary Italian voice of James Bond. Locchi continued to dub Bond while he was portrayed by George Lazenby and Roger Moore. In his animated film roles, he performed the Italian voices of characters in Disney animated feature films. He was the voice of Baloo the Bear in the 1967 film The Jungle Book and Little John in the 1973 film Robin Hood (Both characters were voiced by Phil Harris). He also voiced King Triton in the Italian dub of The Little Mermaid.

Locchi's daughter Marina Locchi works as a theater actress.

Death
In the summer of 1994, Locchi suffered a heart attack followed by a stroke. He died in November later that year just eleven days after his 69th birthday.

After his death, Luciano De Ambrosis became the new Italian voice actor of Sean Connery.

Filmography

Cinema
The Last Adventure (1932)
Zaganella and the Cavalier (1932)
Sette giorni cento lire (1933)
Black Shirt (1933)
Mr. Desire (1934)
The Canal of the Angels (1934)
The Joker King (1935)
100 Days of Napoleon (1935)
La luce del mondo (1935)
God's Will Be Done (1936)
Fireworks (1938)
Who Are You? (1939)
Gli ultimi della strada (1939)
Disturbance (1942)
The Affairs of Messalina (1951) - Uncredited
La trappola di fuoco (1952)
VIP my Brother Superman (1968) - Voice
The Immortal Bachelor (1975)
Stark System (1980)
El Hombre de la multitud (1986)

Dubbing roles

Animation
Baloo in The Jungle Book
Little John in Robin Hood
King Triton in The Little Mermaid
Wise Owl in So Dear to My Heart
Sir Kay in The Sword in the Stone
Toughy in Lady and the Tramp
Gus in Cinderella (1967 redub)
Bear in Bedknobs and Broomsticks
Grifter Chizzling in Hey There, It's Yogi Bear!
Ringo Starr in Yellow Submarine
Narrator in Charlotte's Web

Live action
James Bond in Dr. No
James Bond in From Russia with Love
James Bond in Goldfinger
James Bond in Thunderball
James Bond in Never Say Never Again
James Bond in On Her Majesty's Secret Service
James Bond in Diamonds Are Forever
James Bond in You Only Live Twice
Moses Zebulon 'Shalako' Carlin in Shalako
Edward Pierce in The First Great Train Robbery
Henry Jones, Sr. in Indiana Jones and the Last Crusade
Joe Roberts in The Hill
Marko Ramius in The Hunt for Red October
Bartholomew "Barley" Scott Blair in The Russia House
Colonel Arbuthnot in Murder on the Orient Express
Johnson in The Offence
Agamemnon / Fireman in Time Bandits
Mark Rutland in Marnie
Anthony Richmond in Woman of Straw
Duke Anderson in The Anderson Tapes
Paul Bradley in Meteor
William T. O'Niel in Outland
Robert Campbell in Medicine Man
Roy Urquhart in A Bridge Too Far
Juan Sánchez-Villalobos Ramírez in Highlander
Juan Sánchez-Villalobos Ramírez in Highlander II: The Quickening
William of Baskerville in The Name of the Rose
Alan Caldwell in The Presidio
Jessie McMullen in Family Business
John Connor in Rising Sun
Alex Murray in A Good Man in Africa
Jimmy Malone in The Untouchables
Antoninus in Spartacus
Joe / "Josephine" / "Shell Oil Junior" in Some Like It Hot
George Wellington Tracy in Goodbye Charlie
Steve McCluskey in 40 Pounds of Trouble
Danny Wilde in The Persuaders!
Maurice/Philippe in Paris When It Sizzles
Eric in The Vikings
Albert DeSalvo in The Boston Strangler
Terry Williams in Wild and Wonderful
Johnny Dark in Johnny Dark
Joe Maxwell in So This Is Paris
Archie Porter in Tarzan in Manhattan
Myles Falworth in The Black Shield of Falworth
Andriy Bulba in Taras Bulba
Bellboy in The Lady Gambles
Jerry Florea in Six Bridges to Cross
Pete Hammond Jr. in The Rat Race
Sidney Falco in Sweet Smell of Success
John "Joker" Jackson in The Defiant Ones
Nick Holden in Operation Petticoat
David Wilson in Who Was That Lady?
Cory in Mister Cory
Bernard Lawrence in Boeing Boeing
Joe Martini in The Midnight Story
Jackson Leibowitz in Captain Newman, M.D.
Britt Harris in Kings Go Forth
Ben Matthews in The Rawhide Years
Leslie Gallant III in The Great Race
Ferdinand Waldo Demara in The Great Impostor
Paul Hodges in The Perfect Furlough
Rene de Traviere / The Purple Mask in The Purple Mask
Tino Orsini in Trapeze
Martin N. Fenn in The Mirror Crack'd
Captain Jones in Francis
Trinity in They Call Me Trinity
Trinity in Trinity Is Still My Name
Plata in ... All the Way, Boys!
Sir Thomas Fitzpatrick Phillip Moore in Man of the East
Kid in Watch Out, We're Mad!
Father J. in Two Missionaries
Matt Kirby in Crime Busters
Guido Falcone in Mr. Billion
Johnny Firpo in Odds and Evens
Slim in I'm for the Hippopotamus
Dave Speed in Super Fuzz
Alan Lloyd in Who Finds a Friend Finds a Treasure
Rosco Frazer / Agent Steinberg in Go for It
Marco Segrain in March or Die
Joe Thanks in A Genius, Two Partners and a Dupe
Nobody in My Name Is Nobody
Jeff Heston in Violent City
Arthur Bishop in The Mechanic
Vince Majestyk in Mr. Majestyk
Holland in The Evil That Men Do
Joe Moran / Joe Martin in Cold Sweat
Gifford Hoyt in Caboblanco
Graham Dorsey in From Noon till Three
The Stranger in Someone Behind the Door
Garret Smith in Messenger of Death
John Deakin in Breakheart Pass
Mr. Roberts in The Indian Runner
Reb Haislipp in Jubal
Major Wolenski in Battle of the Bulge
Scott Wardman in Lola
James Bond in Octopussy
James Bond in Moonraker
James Bond in The Man with the Golden Gun
James Bond in Live and Let Die
James Bond in The Spy Who Loved Me
James Bond in For Your Eyes Only
James Bond in A View to a Kill
Paul Lane in The Last Time I Saw Paris
Jack in The King's Thief
Simon Templar in The Saint and the Fiction Makers
Simon Templar in Vendetta for the Saint
Sir George Windsor in Fire, Ice and Dynamite
Ferdinand Griffon in Pierrot le Fou
Jean Letellier in Fear Over the City
Michel Poiccard in Breathless
Louis Dominique Bourguignon in Cartouche
Michel Thibault in Banana Peel
Adrien Dufourquet in That Man from Rio
Arthur Lempereur in Up to His Ears
Louis Mahé in Mississippi Mermaid
François Capella in Borsalino
Roberto La Rocca in Bad Luck
Paul Simay in Dr. Popaul
Azad in The Burglars
François Leclercq in Body of My Enemy
Roger Pilard in The Hunter Will Get You
Victor Vauthier in Incorrigible
Alexandre Stavisky in Stavisky
François Merlin / Bob Saint-Clar in The Magnificent
Josselin Beaumont in The Professional
Yvon "Pierrelot" Morandat in Is Paris Burning?
Barthelemy Cordell in The Inheritor
Antoine Maréchal in Tender Scoundrel
Julien Maillat in Weekend at Dunkirk
François Holin in Ho!
Yancy Hawks in The Wild and the Innocent
Clay in Hell Bent for Leather
Joe Maybe in Ride a Crooked Trail
Jim Harvey in Tumbleweed
Ring Hassard in Sierra
John Clum in Walk the Proud Land
The Utica Kid in Night Passage
Audie Murphy in To Hell and Back
Clay O'Mara in Ride Clear of Diablo
Matt Brown in Cast a Long Shadow
Luke Cromwell in The Duel at Silver Creek
Reb Kittridge in Gunsmoke
Thomas in Beyond Glory
Billy the Kid in The Kid from Texas
John Gant in No Name on the Bullet
John Woodley in Joe Butterfly
Rau-Ru Ponce de Leon in Band of Angels
Homer Smith in Lilies of the Field
Ben Munceford in The Bedford Incident
John Prentice in Guess Who's Coming to Dinner
Virgil Tibbs in In the Heat of the Night
Virgil Tibbs in They Call Me Mister Tibbs!
Virgil Tibbs in The Organization
Roy Parmenter in Little Nikita
Donald Crease in Sneakers
Samuel Trautman in First Blood
Samuel Trautman in Rambo: First Blood Part II
Richard Aldrich in Star!
Oliver Hardy in Laurel and Hardy (1955-1958 redubs)
Vince Everett in Jailhouse Rock
Danny Fisher in King Creole
Chad Gates in Blue Hawaii
Pacer Burton in Flaming Star
Ross Carpenter in Girls! Girls! Girls!
Mike Windgren in Fun in Acapulco
Rick Richards in Paradise, Hawaiian Style
Ted Jackson in Easy Come, Easy Go
Steve Grayson in Speedway
Charlie Rogers in Roustabout
Mike Edwards in It Happened at the World's Fair
Husband E. Kimmel in Tora! Tora! Tora!
Mr. Beamish in St. Elmo's Fire
Juror #1 in 12 Angry Men
Jack in Middle of the Night
Mr. Pym in Two Evil Eyes
Sherif Ali in Lawrence of Arabia
Francisco in Behold a Pale Horse
Major Grau in The Night of the Generals
Feodor Sverdlov in The Tamarind Seed
Nicky Arnstein in Funny Lady
Deacon in The Baltimore Bullet
Lou Caruthers in Back to the Future
Tom Robinson in To Kill a Mockingbird
Narrator in Far and Away
Gordon Grant in A Kiss Before Dying
Child Catcher in Chitty Chitty Bang Bang
Charlie Foster in A Breath of Scandal
John McBurney in The Beguiled
Burt Hanson in Autumn Leaves
Vin Tanner in The Magnificent Seven

References

Bibliography 
 Roberto Curti. Italian Crime Filmography, 1968–1980. McFarland, 2013.

External links 

 
 

1925 births
1994 deaths
Male actors from Rome
Italian male film actors
Italian male voice actors
Italian male stage actors
Italian male child actors
Italian voice directors
20th-century Italian male actors